Ierne may refer to:

 Ériu, a goddess of Ireland
 Ireland - see Éire#Etymology